The 2016 Toyota Premier Cup was the 6th Toyota Premier Cup. It's a single-game cup competition organized by the Toyota  and Football Association of Thailand. It features Buriram United the winners of the 2015 Thai League Cup and Albirex Niigata an invited team from the 2015 J1 League (Japan). It features at i-mobile Stadium. It is sponsored by Toyota Motor (Thailand) Co., Ltd.

Match

Details

Assistant referees:
   Anuwat Feemuechang
   Binlha Preeda
Fourth official:
   Mongkolchai Pechsri
Match Commissioner:
  Danai Mongkolsiri

Winner

References

News from Thairath.
News from Siam Sport. Buriram United VS. Albirex Niigata

2016
2016